St John's Foundation was founded as St John's Hospital in Bath, Somerset, England, in 1174, by Bishop Reginald Fitz Jocelin and is among the oldest almshouses in England. The current building was erected in 1716 and has been designated as a Grade I listed building.

History

The 'hospital of the baths' was built beside the hot springs of the Cross Bath, for their health giving properties and to provide shelter for the poor infirm. It was placed under the control of Bath Cathedral Priory which became Bath Abbey. One of the key benefactors was Canon William of Wheathampstead, who gave substantial areas of land to support the hospital.

Funds were needed for the upkeep of the hospital and, in 1400, the Pope encouraged visitors on certain days to make donations in exchange for being granted remission of their sins. It was suggested in 1527 that the hospital be amalgamated with the Priory to provide greater access to its wealth, however this did not happen. In 1535 it was valued at £22 16s. 9d. During the Dissolution of the monasteries it managed to remain independent and attempts by William Crouch to take it into private property were defeated after the city fathers petitioned Queen Elizabeth I. During the rest of the Elizabethan era when wealthy visitors came to the spa the almshouse provided lodgings.

In 1716 the architect William Killigrew was commissioned to rebuild the hospital. Construction continued after 1727 with John Wood, the Elder undertaking the building, as his first work in Bath, when he was aged 23. He went on to design many of the buildings which created the Georgian city.

Horace Walpole stayed here in 1765.

The site now includes Chapel Court, and still operates to provide a home for over 100 of the local elderly poor and make grants to individuals and organisations in and around Bath. The charity is now known as The Hospital of St John the Baptist with the Chapel of St Michael annexed with St Catherine's Hospital.

Architecture
The architecture is palladian, which is common in Bath.
The two-storey Bath stone building has a heavy ground floor arcade of round-headed arches on pillars, and retains its original window mouldings and sashes.

See also
 List of Grade I listed buildings in Bath and North East Somerset

References

Further reading

External links
 St John's Foundation Est. 1174 web site
 

Residential buildings completed in 1716
Grade I listed buildings in Bath, Somerset
Grade I listed almshouses
Almshouses in Somerset